San Luis Pass is a strait of water at the south-western end of Galveston Island off the Texas Gulf Coast of the U.S. state of Texas. It connects the sheltered waters of West Bay to the open Gulf of Mexico. Fishermen and swimmers have been killed in the Pass' treacherous waters, largely due to the aggressive oceanic currents of Gulf Stream, fluctuating tides in marginal sea, marine sediment, and uncertainties of continental margin. The San Luis Pass-Vacek Toll Bridge spans San Luis Pass from Galveston County to Brazoria County.

Characteristics
Tide levels can vary by almost 2 feet in height, although the tidal effects seem more pronounced along straits than other barrier island zones. Water current dangers are prominent up to about one mile away from the pass along either island. A high amount of drownings occur in the vicinity of the San Luis Pass compared to other areas off of nearby beaches. Until June 2013, about 10 people drowned near San Luis pass on the Galveston side since 2001, and of those about 6 drowned there since 2007. The depth of the pass varies in depths to 40 feet deep.

Tides cause daily variations in topography, and occasionally, storms more drastically change the topography of the pass.

Fishing and recreation
As of August 2017, swimming and fishing are now illegal at San Luis Beach due to the high number of drownings.

Pier fishing on the San Luis Pass Pier was a favorite for visitors and locals alike for many years, however the beach and pier were wiped out during Hurricane Ike in 2008, and it was not rebuilt.  The pass is also home to bank fishermen who often travel many miles to take advantage of the excellent redfish population from June thru October.

Overnight camping, while once allowed, is prohibited on the Galveston side of the pass. The San Luis Pass Camp Ground and county park, on the Brazoria County side, is the only accessible place now. At least from the Galveston Island side, entering the water is prohibited, because of safety hazards.

Hurricane Ike in September 2008, forever changed the topography of the beach. What was once a driveway and public beach access is now part of the Gulf of Mexico. The land where the bait house of the pier once stood is now permanently submerged.

San Luis Pass on the Galveston side is a place for bird watching.

San Luis Pass-Vacek Toll Bridge
The "San Luis Pass-Vacek Toll Bridge" or San Luis Pass Bridge was built shortly before 1970.
It is operated by Galveston County, Road District 1. This bridge has 2 lanes, is 1.3 miles, and has a toll fee of $2. Surfside Beach is the closest city on the other side of Galveston along Brazoria County Road 257. As of 2018, it is the only toll bridge in the Houston Metro area which does not have electronic toll collection and cash only.

Station San Luis and U.S. Life Saving Service
In 1878, the United States Life Saving Service Act authorized the creation of a coastal life saving station near the strait of San Luis Pass. The Station San Luis endured seventy years of coastal service at the west coastline of Galveston Island. The 1949 Texas hurricane delivered a tropical cyclone with an assailable gale and storm surge fatally damaging the San Luis shoreline station. The United States Life-Saving Service discontinued the waterborne search and rescue service by 1950.

San Luis
Across the strait from Galveston, San Luis was an island until 1885, when the strait Little Pass closed. It is now a part of Follet's Island that was once called the Velasco Peninsula.

San Luis, Texas was an abandoned establishment that once had a population of 2,000 after 1836. As of 1989, about 20 people inhabited this area.

The San Luis Pass County Park is on this location.

References

External links
 
 
 A Sedimentologic Description of a Microtidal, Flood-Tidal Delta, San Luis Pass, Texas
 
 

Landforms of Brazoria County, Texas
Galveston, Texas
Bodies of water of Texas
Straits of the United States
Straits of the Caribbean